Laurien Leurink (born 13 November 1994) is a Dutch field hockey midfielder who won a silver medal at the 2016 Summer Olympics.

References

External links

 

1994 births
Living people
Dutch female field hockey players
Medalists at the 2016 Summer Olympics
Olympic silver medalists for the Netherlands
Olympic medalists in field hockey
Field hockey players at the 2016 Summer Olympics
Field hockey players at the 2020 Summer Olympics
Olympic field hockey players of the Netherlands
Sportspeople from Utrecht (city)
Female field hockey midfielders
Olympic gold medalists for the Netherlands
Medalists at the 2020 Summer Olympics
21st-century Dutch women